Anita Earls (born February 20, 1960) is an African-American civil rights attorney, educator and Associate Justice of the Supreme Court of North Carolina. She previously served as the Executive Director of the Southern Coalition for Social Justice, as well as a Deputy Assistant Attorney General in the Civil Rights Division of the United States Department of Justice during the Clinton administration. On November 6, 2018, Earls defeated Republican incumbent Justice Barbara Jackson to win a seat on the state's highest court. Earls is one of the women whose name has been suggested as a potential United States Supreme Court nominee for current President of the United States Joe Biden, and cited "grassroots" encouragement to run for the U.S. Senate in 2022, although she eventually chose not to.

Early life and education 
Earls grew up in Seattle, Washington after her parents relocated the family from Missouri based on the illegality of their interracial marriage (Earls's mother is white, her father black). Earls and her brother (who was darker-skinned than Earls) were both adopted. Earls's first six years in Seattle were spent in a black neighborhood, after which her family integrated a previously all-white neighborhood. In the racially turbulent 1960s, Earls recalled in a 2014 oral history at Duke University that, growing up, "I always had this great fear that because my family looked the way we did, with my brother looking more black than I did, that if we were ever in a neighborhood and a riot broke out, people wouldn’t know that we were a family. And it felt like the wrong people would be trying to hurt us."

Earls is a graduate of Williams College and Yale Law School. Attending Williams College, where she majored in political economy and philosophy, Earls observed that "people knew I wasn’t quite white, but they didn’t really know what I was." Upon graduation Earls received a Thomas J. Watson Fellowship to study the role of women in Ujamaa villages in Tanzania, but her time abroad was cut short by multiple bouts of malaria. She subsequently moved to England, worked in a solicitor's office, and married her first husband. Three years later she returned to the United States to attend Yale Law, because she "had this burning desire to be a lawyer and to try to bring about change [....] I wanted to work on issues of racism in the U.S." During her law school studies she gave birth to her first child.

Legal career 
Following her graduation from Yale Law School, in 1988 Earls was recruited by civil rights champion James Ferguson II to join North Carolina's first integrated law firm, Ferguson, Stein, Watt, Wallas, Adkins & Gresham, where she practiced civil rights litigation first as an associate and later as partner.  The firm was founded by Julius L. Chambers in 1964.

In 1998 Earls was appointed by President Bill Clinton to serve as Deputy Assistant Attorney General in the Civil Rights Division of the U.S. Department of Justice.

After serving as director of the Lawyers' Committee for Civil Rights' voting rights project (2000-2003) and as director of advocacy at the University of North Carolina Center for Civil Rights (2003-2007), in 2007 she founded the Southern Coalition For Social Justice (SCSJ) in Durham, NC, a 501(c)(3) nonprofit organization whose team of lawyers, social scientists, community organizers and media specialists "partners with communities of color and economically disadvantaged communities in the south to defend and advance their political, social and economic rights through the combination of legal advocacy, research, organizing and communications." There she served as SCSJ's founding executive director, stepping down in 2017 to run for Associate Justice of the North Carolina Supreme Court.

While at SCSJ, Earls represented clients in several notable voting rights lawsuits, including serving as lead plaintiffs' attorney in North Carolina v. Covington, a landmark case that the U.S. Supreme Court affirmed in 2017, which resulted in 28 of North Carolina's state house and senate districts being deemed unconstitutional racial gerrymanders. A federal court then ordered a special master to redraw the districts' boundaries for the 2018 election, where under the new maps, state Democrats broke the legislature's nearly decade-long Republican supermajority.

Earls has taught at Duke University, the University of North Carolina at Chapel Hill and the University of Maryland.

Judicial career
Following her election to Associate Justice of the Supreme Court of North Carolina, Earls has written numerous opinions of significance on issues such as the North Carolina Racial Justice Act, the maintenance of privacy rights associated with warrantless searches, and media defamation suits.

On June 9, 2020, Governor Roy Cooper appointed Earls as the Co-Chair of North Carolina's Task Force for Racial Equity in Criminal Justice. The Task Force, convened in the wake of the murder of George Floyd, has begun issuing recommendations such as banning choke holds, suggesting that law enforcement agencies implement "duty to report" rules regarding excessive force, and requiring North Carolina to include information on race in its data reporting. The work of the task force is ongoing.

Citing unnamed sources, the Washington Post reported that Earls was among the short-list of candidates under consideration by the Biden administration for nomination to the United States Supreme Court to replace retiring Justice Breyer. Ultimately, Biden nominated District Judge Ketanji Brown Jackson to fill the vacancy.

Personal life 
Anita is married to Charles D. Walton, a native of Raleigh, North Carolina.  He was the first African-American to serve in the Rhode Island State Senate. In 2005 Senator Walton was honored by that body for his tireless efforts on behalf of Rhode Island's minority community and for inspiring and preparing minority students to obtain post-secondary educational degrees for more than two decades. In 2009 he was awarded an honorary doctor of laws degree from the University of Rhode Island.

Electoral history

See also 
 Joe Biden Supreme Court candidates
 List of African-American jurists

References 

1960 births
Living people
20th-century American lawyers
21st-century American judges
African-American judges
North Carolina Democrats
North Carolina lawyers
Justices of the North Carolina Supreme Court
University of Maryland, Baltimore faculty
University of North Carolina at Chapel Hill faculty
Williams College alumni
Yale Law School alumni
20th-century American women lawyers
21st-century American women judges
American women academics
20th-century African-American women
20th-century African-American people
21st-century African-American women
21st-century African-American people